Brassia cochleata is an epiphytic species of orchid. it is native to northern South America (French Guinea, Guyana, Suriname, Venezuela, Colombia, Ecuador, Peru, northern Brazil).

References

cochleata
Plants described in 1838
Orchids of South America